Jim Browning is the Internet alias of a software engineer and YouTuber from Northern Ireland whose content focuses on scam baiting and investigating call centres engaging in fraudulent activities.

Scambaiting
A software engineer, Browning began researching scam operations after his relative lost money to a technical support scam. He started his YouTube channel to upload footage to send to authorities as evidence against scammers. 

He has since carried out investigations into various scams, in which he infiltrates computer networks run by scammers who claim to be technical support experts or pose as US IRS agents and use remote desktop software or social engineering. Such scams have involved unsolicited calls offering computer services, or websites posing to be reputable companies such as Dell or Microsoft.

BBC Panorama investigation
Browning was featured in a March 2020 episode of British documentary series Panorama, in which a large-scale technical support scamming operation was infiltrated and extensively documented by Browning and fellow YouTuber Karl Rock. The duo recorded drone and CCTV footage of the facility in Gurugram, Haryana, and gathered incriminating evidence linking alleged scammer Amit Chauhan, who also operated a fraudulent travel agency called "Faremart Travels'', to a series of scams targeting computer-illiterate and elderly people in the United Kingdom and United States. During a private meeting with his associates, Chauhan was quoted as stating, "We don't give a shit about our customers". Some of his call centre agents were recorded scamming and laughing at a British man who admitted to being depressed. They were also recorded conning a blind woman with diabetes. Although Chauhan denied the allegations in a phone interview with the BBC, he was arrested along with his accountant Sumit Kumar in a raid.

Money-mule catching
In March 2021, Browning and Mark Rober collaborated to construct and distribute automated glitter bombs to identify and report money mules who were receiving their money via shipping services, such as FedEx, before sending it to the scammers.

New York Times interview
Browning was covered in a 2021 New York Times article documenting their confrontation of a small-scale refund scam operation based in Kolkata. The journalist, Yudhijit Bhattacharjee, a native of Kolkata who moved to the United States, described a December 2019 scam-baiting operation by Browning, during which Browning intercepted a refund scam involving an elderly woman. Suspicious, the woman told the scammer that she would cease contact with him, only for the scammer to lock her computer. Browning was able to contact the woman and help her unlock the computer. Bhattacharjee later flew to India to check out call centers that Browning had identified as possible scammers and to confront the individual who had perpetrated the refund scam on the elderly woman.

AARP report
The April 2021 issue of the American Association of Retired Persons (AARP) Bulletin contains an 11-page article by the director of AARP's Washington state office, centering on Browning's work fighting cyber scams.

Temporary channel deletion 
On July 26, 2021, Browning was targeted by scammers who pretended to be YouTube support staff and misled him into deleting his own channel. His channel was reinstated four days later. He explained in a video that the scammer used Google Chat to send an authenticated phishing email from the "google.com" domain and convinced Browning to delete his channel under the pretense of moving it to a new YouTube brand account.

Awards and nominations

Notes

References

External links

Activists from Northern Ireland
British computer specialists
British software engineers
English-language YouTube channels
Fraud in India
Hackers
Hacking in the 2010s
Hacking in the 2020s
Living people
Technology YouTubers
Unidentified people
Year of birth missing (living people)
YouTubers from Northern Ireland
Social engineering (computer security)
Internet vigilantism
YouTube channels launched in 2014